Letitia Ann James (born October 18, 1958) is an American lawyer and politician. She is a member of the Democratic Party and the current Attorney General of New York, having won the 2018 election to succeed appointed Attorney General Barbara Underwood. She is the first African-American and first woman to be elected to the position.

Born and raised in Brooklyn, James obtained her J.D. degree at Howard University in Washington, D.C., after graduating from Lehman College in The Bronx. She worked as a public defender, then on staff in the New York State Assembly, and later as a New York State Assistant Attorney General (Brooklyn Regional Office).

James served as a member of the New York City Council from 2004 to 2013. She represented the 35th district, which includes the Brooklyn neighborhoods of Clinton Hill, Fort Greene, parts of Crown Heights, Prospect Heights, and Bedford-Stuyvesant. James chaired the Economic Development and Sanitation Committees, and served on several other committees. She was later the New York City Public Advocate from 2013 to 2018. As Public Advocate, she became the first African American woman to be elected to and hold citywide office in New York City.

James was a candidate in the 2022 New York gubernatorial election. She announced her candidacy on October 29, 2021, and suspended her campaign on December 9, 2021, opting to run for re-election as attorney general instead.

Early life and education 
Letitia Ann James was born on October 18, 1958, in Brooklyn, New York. She is one of eight children born to Nellie James (b. 1919, Martinsville, Virginia) and Robert James. She attended New York City public schools. Raised in Park Slope, Brooklyn, she attended Fort Hamilton High School. She received her B.A. from the City University of New York's Lehman College in 1981, majoring in liberal arts with an emphasis on social work.

She received her J.D. degree from Howard University School of Law in Washington, D.C. in 1987, and was admitted to practice law in New York State in 1989. In 2013, James attended Columbia University’s School of International and Public Affairs (SIPA) located in New York City for a degree in Master of Public Administration.

Career 
James served as a public defender for the Legal Aid Society and established the Urban Network, a coalition of African American professional organizations aimed at providing scholarships for young people.

She served on former New York Governor Mario Cuomo's Task Force on Diversity in the Judiciary. She served as counsel for Albert Vann, Chief of Staff for Roger L. Green in the New York State Assembly, and in the administration of New York Attorney General Eliot Spitzer. She was appointed the first Assistant Attorney General in charge of the Brooklyn regional office in 1999. While working in that position, James worked in many capacities but notably focused on consumer complaints involving predatory lending and other unlawful business practices.

2001 and 2003 city council races 
James' first run for the 35th Council district was in November 2001. In a close race, James received 42% of the vote on the Working Families Party line but lost to James E. Davis, a Democrat. In July 2003, just months before the next election, Davis was assassinated by Othniel Askew, a former political rival. Following Davis's death, his brother Geoffrey ran for his vacant Council seat on the Democratic Party ticket, but on election day, November 4, 2003, Geoffrey A. Davis lost by a large margin to James as the Working Families Party nominee. In that 2003 race, James officially became a member of the Working Families Party, and was the first citywide office-holder to run solely on the WFP line.

City council tenure 

James is the first member of the Working Families Party to win office in New York State, and the first third-party member to be elected to the city council since 1977. She has since changed back to the Democratic party.

James again won the Working Families and the Democratic parties' nominations by a large margin over Samuel Eric Blackwell, an urban planner at Long Island University and pro-stadium advocate. She was re-elected on the Democratic line on November 8, 2005, with 88.11% of the vote, compared to 6.80% for Republican Anthony Herbert, and 5.08% for Independence Party candidate Charles B. Billups.

On October 10, 2006, there was a devastating fire at the Broken Angel House, an architectural icon in Clinton Hill, Brooklyn. The fire attracted attention from the New York City Department of Buildings, which resulted in citations being issued for numerous building code violations. James represented Broken Angel's owner, Arthur Wood, pro bono in his negotiations to keep his home. The agency decided to allow Wood to re-occupy Broken Angel provided the upper levels were taken down and the central stairwell reconstructed.

She was the first to question cost overruns and irregularities in the subcontracting work of the new CityTime payroll system much touted by Bloomberg which eventually led to several indictments, Bloomberg asking a tech giant for $600 million back, and two consultants fleeing the country in 2011.

James originally advocated for the demolition of the Second Empire houses on Admiral's Row in order to build a parking lot for a proposed supermarket to serve residents in nearby housing developments, but later supported preserving some of the historic housing. In 2008, James, with Bill de Blasio, advocated against Mayor Michael Bloomberg's attempts to seek a third term without a voter referendum.

James won the Democratic primary in September 2009 against her opponents, community organizer Delia Hunley-Adossa, who received more than $200,000 from Forest City Ratner and Medhanie Estiphanos, a financial consultant. James went on to win re-election for a second term.

In May 2013, with a group that included construction unions, community groups and other elected officials, she was a part of an Article 78 lawsuit against the Bloomberg administration and Acadia Realty Trust seeking the shut-down of the City Point real estate project and a reassessment of its environmental impact.

In June 2016, James attempted to pressure six financial institutions, including BB&T, Berkshire Bank, Citizens Financial Group, People's United Bank, Regions Financial Corporation and TD Bank, into ending its practice of providing financial services to gun manufacturers. BB&T was specifically requested to drop the accounts of SIG Sauer of New Hampshire, but denied the request.

Committee assignments 
Committee on Economic Development (chair)
Committee on Sanitation (chair)
Committee on Parks & Recreation
Committee on Small Business
Committee on Technology in Government
Committee on Veteran Affairs
Committee on Women's Issues

Public Advocate 

In 2013, James ran for New York City Public Advocate and received 36% of the vote in the first Democratic primary, under the 40% threshold that would have avoided a runoff election. James won the runoff election on October 1, 2013, against Daniel Squadron, 59%–41%, becoming the party's nominee for the city's elected watchdog position in November.

In the 2013 election campaign for Public Advocate, James was endorsed by many of the city's important labor unions, NOW, Planned Parenthood, Democracy for NYC, League of Conservation Voters, Amsterdam News and El Diario. On October 1, 2013, James achieved a Democratic primary win in spite of her campaign fundraising trailing Daniel Squadron's and Reshma Saujani, to become the Democratic Party's nominee for New York City's elected watchdog position. She was endorsed by third-place finisher Saujani in September James won the Democratic runoff election. Without a Republican opponent, she won the general election with over 83% of the vote.

In 2017, James won the Democratic primary for her position with 77% of the vote, over closest competitor David Eisenbach's 23%.

New York State Attorney General

2018 election 

In May 2018, James, who initially planned to run for Mayor of New York City in 2021, declared her candidacy for Attorney General of New York and won the Democratic primary on September 13, 2018, with 40.6% of the vote; she defeated Zephyr Teachout (31%) and two other candidates. On November 6, 2018, she was elected attorney general, defeating Republican Keith Wofford. With her election as Attorney General, she became the first woman in New York to be elected as Attorney General, the first African-American woman to be elected to statewide office, and the first African American to serve as Attorney General.

Tenure 

James was sworn in as attorney general on January 1, 2019, succeeding Barbara Underwood, who was first appointed after the resignation of Eric Schneiderman.

State civil suit against the NRA
In August 2020, James filed a civil lawsuit in New York Supreme Court against the National Rifle Association (NRA), accusing the organization of corruption and financial misconduct, and calling for its dissolution. The NRA filed a countersuit against James, citing statements she made during her 2018 campaign.

Investigation into state COVID-19 response
In early March 2020, the Attorney General's office began to preliminarily "investigate allegations of COVID-19-related neglect of residents in nursing homes." The office solicited and subsequently received 953 complaints from patients' families regarding neglect of patients through November 16. The probe released its first report on both the nursing homes and the state Department of Health (DOH) on January 28, 2021, where it concluded that the department's public data under-counted nursing home deaths by up to 50 percent. James said investigations into 20 separate nursing homes "whose reported conduct during the first wave of the pandemic presented particular concern" would continue for the foreseeable future. The report was heralded by some in Albany as a "declaration of independence" from Governor Andrew Cuomo after a two-year alliance in opposition to President Donald Trump.

Three weeks after the report, the Albany Times-Union revealed an ongoing joint investigation by the FBI and the United States Attorney for the Eastern District of New York, examining how Governor Andrew Cuomo's coronavirus task-force played a role in nursing homes' COVID-19 response. On March 18, 2021, The City found that the FBI's scope included a last-minute addition to the state's 2020 budget that provided greater immunity to long-term care organizations. The head of the Greater New York Hospital Association said in an August 2020 New York State Senate hearing that the lobbying group had provided a "draft" of "some ideas to be included" to the Governor's office.

Report on Andrew Cuomo sexual harassment
On August 3, 2021, James' office released a report finding that New York State Governor Andrew Cuomo engaged in multiple acts of sexual harassment.

2022 Democratic primary for governor 
On October 29, 2021, James announced her intention to run for the office of Governor of New York in the 2022 Democratic primary. If elected, James would become the first Black female governor of any state. In December, she withdrew from the race after consistently polling behind incumbent Governor Kathy Hochul, with James instead choosing to seek re-election as Attorney General.

Trump lawsuit in New York

James in her capacity as the New York attorney general has filed a civil lawsuit against the Trump Organization and worked alongside the Manhattan district attorney in its criminal investigation of the organization.

2022 election 

After James announced her re-election bid, all previous Democratic candidates withdrew their candidacies and endorsed her. On November 8, 2022, James was reelected attorney general, defeating Republican Michael Henry in the general election.

Personal life 
James lives in the Clinton Hill neighborhood of Brooklyn and is a member of the Emmanuel Baptist Church.

Electoral history

New York City Council

New York City Public Advocate

New York Attorney General

See also 
 Joe Biden Supreme Court candidates

References

External links 

 Government website
 Campaign website

|-

|-

|-

1958 births
Living people
20th-century African-American people
20th-century African-American women
21st-century African-American women
21st-century African-American politicians
21st-century American politicians
21st-century American women politicians
2016 United States presidential electors
2020 United States presidential electors
African-American New York City Council members
African-American people in New York (state) politics
African-American women in politics
American gun control activists
Howard University School of Law alumni
Lehman College alumni
American LGBT rights activists
New York (state) Democrats
New York (state) lawyers
New York City Council members
New York City Public Advocates
New York State Attorneys General
Politicians from Brooklyn
Public defenders
Recycling in New York City
School of International and Public Affairs, Columbia University alumni
Women New York City Council members
Working Families Party politicians